Lactarius mairei is a member of the large milk-cap genus Lactarius in the order Russulales. Originally found in Morocco, it was described as new to science in 1939 by Georges Jean Louis Malençon.

See also
List of Lactarius species

References

External links

mairei
Fungi described in 1939
Fungi of Africa
Fungi of Europe